Miroslav Tulis  (born 23 January 1951 in Šumperk) is a Czech former track and field sprinter who competed internationally for Czechoslovakia.

He  was a 200 metres and 400 metres runner and represented Czechoslovakia in 19 international competitions.

He was the bronze medallist at the 1978 European Athletics Championships together with Josef Lomický, František Břečka and Karel Kolář.

At national level, in the 400 metres he established Czechoslovak record of 46.33 seconds on 27 August 1977 in Ostrava. He was a nine-time champion at the Czechoslovak Athletics Championships.

He is active in Ministry of Defence & Armed Forces of the Czech Republic.

International competitions

National titles

References 

1951 births
People from Šumperk
Czech male sprinters
Czechoslovak male sprinters
European Athletics Championships medalists
Living people
Sportspeople from the Olomouc Region